Banco de la Producción S.A., better known as Produbanco, is an Ecuadorian bank. It is the head of the Grupo Financiero Producción. The bank began operations in November 1978.

See also

Banking in Ecuador

External links
Official site

Banks of Ecuador
Banks established in 1978